Army Group Ostmark was a German army group formed near the end of World War II.

Army Group Ostmark was formed on 2 April 1945 by order of Adolf Hitler from the remnants of Army Group South and was briefly operational in Austria and the Protectorate of Bohemia and Moravia. Army Group Ostmark was one of the last major German military formations to surrender to the Allies. 

The only commander during the army group's 36-day existence was Dr. Lothar Rendulic, who surrendered himself and the army group to the US Army on 8 May 1945 after signing a surrender document at the city of Steyr one day before.

Commander

References

Ostmark
Military units and formations established in 1945
Military units and formations disestablished in 1945